Razzie Award for Worst Actress is an award presented at the annual Golden Raspberry Awards to the worst actress of the previous year. Male actors performing in drag are eligible, as it is intended as a humorous award.

The following is a list of recipients and nominees of that award, along with the films for which they were nominated.

The category of "actress" has expanded to include the subjects of documentary films.

To date, two nominations have been rescinded.  On March 31, 2022, the Golden Raspberry committee decided to rescind Shelley Duvall's nomination for her performance in The Shining, stating that it was recently brought to their attention that the performance was impacted by the intense treatment she received from director Stanley Kubrick and that they didn't wish to punish victims. On January 24, 2023, a day after announcing the nominees for the 43rd Golden Raspberry Awards, the Razzies decided to rescind their nomination for Ryan Kiera Armstrong after facing immense backlash for what was publicly perceived as cruel, given the fact that Armstrong was a minor at the time of the nomination.

Winners and nominees

1980s

1990s

2000s

2010s

2020s

Multiple wins and nominations

Multiple wins

5 wins
Madonna
   
3 wins
Bo Derek

2 wins
Demi Moore
Tyler Perry (in drag)
Sharon Stone
Pia Zadora

Multiple nominations

6 nominations
Melanie Griffith
Madonna
Demi Moore
   
5 nominations
Kim Basinger
Jennifer Lopez
Tyler Perry (in drag)
Sharon Stone
   
4 nominations
Hilary Duff 
Faye Dunaway
Megan Fox
Angelina Jolie

3 nominations
Jessica Alba
Linda Blair
Bo Derek
Cameron Diaz
Katherine Heigl
Lindsay Lohan
Brigitte Nielsen
Sarah Jessica Parker
Brooke Shields
Kristen Stewart
Sean Young

2 nominations
Drew Barrymore
Halle Berry
Sandra Bullock
Joan Chen
Miley Cyrus
Whoopi Goldberg
Anne Hathaway
Kate Hudson
Dakota Johnson
Milla Jovovich
Diane Keaton
Sondra Locke
Melissa McCarthy
Bette Midler
Olivia Newton-John
Julia Roberts
Tanya Roberts
Ally Sheedy
Talia Shire
Alicia Silverstone
Barbra Streisand
Charlize Theron
Uma Thurman
Naomi Watts
Pia Zadora

Notes

References

External links

Golden Raspberry Awards at the Internet Movie Database

Actress
Film awards for lead actress